Diego Maradona stadium can refer to:

Estadio Diego Armando Maradona, home stadium of Argentinos Juniors in Buenos Aires, Argentina
Stadio Diego Armando Maradona, home stadium of Napoli in Naples, Italy